Helophilus obscurus  (Loew, 1863), the Obscure Marsh Fly, is a common species of syrphid fly observed throughout Canada and the northern United States and Rocky Mountains. Hoverflies can remain nearly motionless in flight. The adults are also known as flower flies for they are commonly found on flowers, from which they get both energy-giving nectar and protein-rich pollen. The larvae of this genus are associated with wet decaying organic material, particularly accumulations of decaying vegetation in ponds and mud and farmyard manure or silage the larvae of this species are not known.

References

Eristalinae
Articles created by Qbugbot
Insects described in 1863
Taxa named by Hermann Loew
Hoverflies of North America